The discography of Japanese female duo FEMM includes one studio album, one remix album, two extended plays, four remix singles, and ten singles. All of their English and Japanese musical releases have been with Maximum10 and Avex Music Creative Inc., two sub-division record labels of Avex Group.

FEMM, who debuted under the abbreviated name Far East Mention Mannequins, originally debuted with several singles and an extended play (EP) Astroboy. Performing in the English language, they released several singles through digital retail stores including iTunes Store and Amazon.com; some of the singles include "Kill the DJ", "Fxxk Boyz Get Money", and "Dead Wrong". FEMM released their debut studio album Femm-Isation (2014) through digital retail stores, and was a collection of songs that FEMM released premiered through their official YouTube channel. After signing an exclusive distribution deal with London-based record label JPU Records, FEMM released their debut physical release Pow!/L.C.S., which also issued a double album with the physical edition of Femm-Isation.

Throughout their career, FEMM have released several music videos to support the release of their singles. FEMM have also promoted their work by releasing remix versions of their previous singles. FEMM released their first remix album in 2014, Femm-Isation Instrumentals, which is an album containing instrumental versions of their debut album.

Discography

Albums

EPs

Remixes

Cover albums

Singles

Remix singles

Featuring singles

As part of FAMM'IN

Other songs

Music videos
FEMM have released a total of 17 music videos from their own discography, alongside one live concert video, three miscellaneous promotional videos, one remix video, and two featuring artist music videos. A total of 13 music videos from their debut album Femm-Isation were directed by creative unit IKIOI. Each music video from FEMM's discography has been choreographed by Japanese production and choreographing team Hidali. The group's fashion directors and designs are by Shoichiro Matsuoka of GM Atelier, a Japanese fashion company that specialize in latex fabrics. Several music videos by FEMM, particularly "Kill the DJ", "Fxxk Boyz Get Money", and "Party All Night", received a large amount of favorable feedback, praising the concept, its convenient use of cosplay and otaku culture, and choreography. "Fxxk Boyz Get Money" received media attention for its imagery and choreography, with several online figures including American blogger and journalist Perez Hilton, American YouTube star Miles Jai, among others publicly commended the video and FEMM themselves.

References

External links
FEMM's discography

Discographies of Japanese artists
Pop music discographies